Sporidiales was an order in the kingdom of Fungi. It contained the family Sporidiobolaceae.

References